The Proterra ZX5 is a battery electric bus that is built by American electric vehicle company, Proterra. Introduced in 2020, the bus is Proterra's primary product, and is the third generation of battery electric bus built by the company.

History 
On September 15, 2020, Proterra announced the replacement to the Catalyst, the ZX5, available in  nominal lengths. Edmonton Transit System of Edmonton, Alberta was the launch customer for the 40-foot ZX5.

Background

Design updates 
The ZX5 features the same fiberglass and balsa wood body structure as the Catalyst, but incorporate design changes to both increase battery capacity and standardization with electric vehicle charging protocols. The overall appearance of the vehicle is more angular, while the roof fairing is more streamlined with provisions for roof-mounted battery packs, as well as optional integrated roof charger rails. The redesigned roof fairing has decreased overall height by  compared to the Catalyst.

Multiple battery options are offered on the ZX5, designated ZX5, ZX5+, and ZX5 MAX for the 220, 440, and  models, respectively. Each of the three battery options is also offered with one of two drivetrains, which Proterra brands DuoPower or ProDrive. The ZX5MAX is the longest-range option available. The ZX5MAX battery option is only available for the 40-foot length ZX5.

DuoPower models use two independent  motors, operating at a claimed , depending on the battery and body length.

In 2022, Proterra introduced an updated ProDrive 2.0 which pairs the motor with a four-speed transmission from Eaton with electric shifting. This new transmission allows buses to climb steeper grades, accelerate faster, and operate more efficiently, extending range.

Charging 
The ZX5 can be charged using the SAE J3105 (OppCharge) overhead charging protocol while stopped on a layover (opportunity charging) or while parked in a storage yard, or with a plug-in J1772 CCS DC fast charger when parked in a storage yard.

The ZX5 with any battery option can be fully charged in around 2.9 hours using the OppCharge system, which offers a maximum charging rate of 330 kW. Utilizing plug-in charging, the standard ZX5 takes around 2.9 hours to be fully charged, while the ZX5 MAX takes around 4.7 hours to be fully charged at a more limited rate of 132 kW, assuming a 200 A DC power supply. One CCS charge port is standard at the rear curbside corner, and an additional CCS port can be added either at the front curbside or rear streetside corner.

References

External links 

 Proterra transit buses product page

Buses of the United States
Buses of Canada
Battery electric buses
Vehicles introduced in 2020
Low-floor buses
Single-deck buses
Proterra vehicles